As Good as Dead is the second studio album by American rock band Local H. It was released on April 16, 1996 by Island Records.

A concept album, As Good as Dead is about dead-end, small-town life based on the band's origins in Zion, Illinois. The album's title comes from a line in the song "Eddie Vedder." Some prints of the album received a Parental Advisory sticker, due to the use of profanity in the song "High-Fiving MF" and others.

Four singles were released from the album: "Bound for the Floor," "High-Fiving MF," "Eddie Vedder" and "Fritz's Corner." It remains to be their best-selling album to date.

Track listing

Personnel
Local H
Scott Lucas – vocals, guitar, bass
Joe Daniels – drums
Production
Steven Haigler – producer, engineer
Local H – producer
Andy Katz – engineer

Chart positions

Album

Release history

Appearances
The song "Bound for the Floor" was featured in the films Blackrock in 1997, No Looking Back in 1998 and Big Nothing in 2006, the video game Saints Row in 2006, and in the thirty-fifth episode of Casual in 2017.

References

1996 albums
Concept albums
Island Records albums
Local H albums